John McGrath may refer to:

Politicians
 John J. McGrath (1872–1951), U.S. Representative from California
 John McGrath (New South Wales politician) (1893–1971), Labor member of the New South Wales Legislative Assembly
 John McGrath (Victorian politician) (1939–2021), National member of the Victorian Legislative Assembly
 John McGrath (Western Australian politician) (born 1947), Liberal member of the Western Australian Legislative Assembly

Footballers
 John McGrath (footballer, born 1932) (born 1932), football inside forward (Notts County and Darlington 1955–59)
 John McGrath (footballer, born 1938) (1938–1998), English football centre half (Bury, Newcastle and Southampton 1955–73), later manager
 John McGrath (Irish footballer) (born 1980), Irish footballer

Hurlers
 John McGrath (Tipperary hurler) (born 1994), Irish hurler
 John McGrath (Westmeath hurler) (1928–1980), Irish hurler

Other sportsmen
 John McGrath (athlete), United States national shot put champion 1965
 Jack McGrath (racing driver) (1919–1955), American racecar driver
 John McGrath (ice hockey), Canadian ice hockey player and political advisor

Performing arts
 John McGrath (artistic director) (born 1962), British artistic director and CEO of Manchester International Festival
 John McGrath (playwright) (1935–2002), Liverpudlian-Irish playwright

Others
 John McGrath (entrepreneur), Australian businessperson 
 John W. McGrath (1842–1905), American jurist
 Denis McGrath (lawyer) (1910–1986), New Zealand lawyer and politician
 Sir John McGrath (judge) (1945–2018), judge of the Supreme Court of New Zealand
 John McGrath (POW),

See also
 John Magrath (disambiguation)